Herb Grubel (born February 26, 1934 in Frankfurt, Germany), former Canadian politician 
Markus Grübel (born 1959), German politician
Oswald Grübel (born November 23, 1943), German businessman
Grubel–Lloyd index, measures intra-industry trade